Boronia thedae, commonly known as the Theda boronia, is a plant in the citrus family, Rutaceae and is endemic to a small area in the Kimberley region of Western Australia. It is an erect shrub when young, later a prostrate shrub with many branches, pinnate leaves, four white to cream-coloured or pale pink sepals and four similarly coloured petals, the sepals longer and wider than the petals.

Description
Boronia thedae is an erect, hairy shrub when young, later a spreading or prostrate, more or less glabrous shrub with many branches. The eight stamens are hairy with those nearest the sepals having a much larger anther than those near the petals.

Taxonomy and naming
Boronia thedae was first formally described in 2015 by Russell Barrett, Matthew Barrett and Marco Duretto and the description was published in Nuytsia from a specimen collected on Theda Station in the Kimberley region of Western Australia. The specific epithet (thedae) refers to the type location, Theda Station, which in turn, was named after the wife of the founder of the station lease.

Distribution and habitat
Theda boronia is only known from Theda Station and from there to near Drysdale River National Park. It grows in woodland between sandstone boulders.

Conservation status
Boronia thedae is classified as "Priority One" by the Government of Western Australia Department of Parks and Wildlife, meaning that it is known from only one or a few locations which are potentially at risk.

References

thedae
Flora of Western Australia
Plants described in 2015
Taxa named by Marco Duretto
Taxa named by Russell Lindsay Barrett
Taxa named by Matthew David Barrett